= H. Ramat Gan =

H. Ramat Gan may refer to:

- Hakoah Amidar Ramat Gan F.C.
- Hapoel Ramat Gan Giv'atayim F.C.
